The 2017–18 Army Black Knights men's basketball team represented the United States Military Academy during the 2017–18 NCAA Division I men's basketball season. The Black Knights, led by second-year head coach Jimmy Allen, played their home games at Christl Arena in West Point, New York as members of the Patriot League. They finished the season 13–17, 6–12 in Patriot League play to finish in a tie for eighth place. They lost in the first round of the Patriot League tournament to Loyola (MD).

Previous season
The Black Knights finished the 2016–17 season 13–19, 6–12 in Patriot League play to finish in eighth place. As the No. 8 seed in the Patriot League tournament, they defeated American in the first round before losing to top-seeded Bucknell in the quarterfinals.

Offseason

2017 recruiting class

Roster

Schedule and results

|-
!colspan=9 style=| Non-conference regular season

|-
!colspan=9 style=| Patriot League regular season

|-
!colspan=9 style=| Patriot League tournament

Source

References

Army Black Knights men's basketball seasons
Army
Army Black Knights men's basketball
Army Black Knights men's basketball